Columbiana County Airport  is a public airport located four miles northwest of East Liverpool, Ohio, United States. It is owned and operated by the Columbiana County Airport Authority.

Facilities and aircraft 
For the 12-month period ending September 12, 2014, the airport had 31,156 aircraft operations: 31,020 general aviation, 110 Air Taxi and 26 Military.

References

External links 

County airports in Ohio